Sebastian Zielinsky (born 21 February 1988) is a German retired footballer.

References

External links

Sebastian Zielinsky at Fupa

1988 births
Living people
German footballers
1. FC Köln II players
1. FC Köln players
FC Ingolstadt 04 players
SV Wacker Burghausen players
SV Darmstadt 98 players
1. FC Lokomotive Leipzig players
Bundesliga players
2. Bundesliga players
3. Liga players
Association football midfielders
Association football forwards
Footballers from Cologne